Luis Eduardo Vélez Sánchez (born 26 July 1986, in Guadalajara, Jalisco) is an athlete from Mexico, who competes in archery.

2008 Summer Olympics
At the 2008 Summer Olympics in Beijing, Vélez finished his ranking round with a total of 660 points, which gave him the 24th seed for the final competition bracket in which he faced Vic Wunderle in the first round. Wunderle was only the 41st seed, but already had a lot of experience and showed that in the confrontation with Vélez. Wunderle won the game with 106–102.

2012 Summer Olympics 
At the 2012 Summer Olympics Vélez competed in both the men's individual and the men's team events. In the individual event, he was 26th after the ranking round.  He faced Milad Vaziri in the first knockout round, winning 7–1. He was then knocked out by eventual bronze medallist Dai Xiaoxiang, 6–0.

In the team event, Mexico beat Malaysia 216 - 211 in the first round. They went on to beat France 220 - 212 in the quarterfinals, before losing 215 - 217 to Italy in the semifinal. Mexico faced South Korea in the bronze medal shoot-off, losing 219–224.

References

1986 births
Living people
Mexican male archers
Archers at the 2007 Pan American Games
Archers at the 2008 Summer Olympics
Archers at the 2011 Pan American Games
Archers at the 2012 Summer Olympics
Olympic archers of Mexico
Sportspeople from Guadalajara, Jalisco
Pan American Games silver medalists for Mexico
Pan American Games bronze medalists for Mexico
Pan American Games medalists in archery
Medalists at the 2011 Pan American Games